Vandiver-Trout-Clause House is a historic home located at Ridgeville, Mineral County, West Virginia.  For many years it provided accommodations for travelers and also served as a post office, tavern, polling place, and landmark.  It is an "L"-shaped, two story frame building with a gable roof in a vernacular Federal style.  It was built sometime in the first quarter of the 19th century.

It was listed on the National Register of Historic Places in 1979.

References

Houses on the National Register of Historic Places in West Virginia
Federal architecture in West Virginia
Houses in Mineral County, West Virginia
National Register of Historic Places in Mineral County, West Virginia
Drinking establishments on the National Register of Historic Places in West Virginia